Yksel Osmanovski (Turkish: Yüksel Osmanoğlu; born 24 February 1977) is a Swedish former professional footballer who played as a striker. Starting off his career with Malmö FF in the mid-1990s, he went on to represent Bari, Torino, and Bordeaux before retiring at Malmö FF in 2007. A full international between 1998 and 2006, he won 15 caps for the Sweden national team and represented them at UEFA Euro 2000.

Early life
Born in Skrävlinge, Malmö, Osmanovski grew up in Rosengård, where fellow Swedish footballer Zlatan Ibrahimović also grew up. In an early interview, Zlatan said that "within a few years, I will play in Italy, and eventually the national team. I want to follow in Yksel's footsteps. We know each other, even if he is four years older than me. I got his autograph when he started playing for Malmö FF, when I played in Malmö BI. When he came to Rosengård and played and dribbled with us kids, we were all shouting "Yksel, Yksel, Yksel!" - Ibrahimović, in 2000.

Club career
Osmanovski played for Malmö BI and IFK Malmö as a child, but joined Malmö FF in 1987 where he eventually made his debut in 1995. He gradually became a star in the Swedish league, and was bought by Italian Serie A outfit Bari. After three seasons he moved on to Torino, but struggled to capture a first team place. He had a loan spell at Bordeaux, where he was on the bench when they won the 2002 Coupe de la Ligue Final, before returning to Malmö FF in 2004. There he was part of the team that won the Allsvenskan league title, although Osmanovski himself did not receive a winner's medal, because he took part in too few matches. Still he played the crucial role, in stopping a ball on the goal line against title rivals Halmstad BK. Had it gone in, Malmö would certainly not won the league title, but thanks to a 2–2 draw, they kept themselves within a shot.

In February 2008, Osmanovski announced his retirement from professional football, having not had his contract with Malmö renewed.

International career
Osmanovski was the first Muslim to represent Sweden. He played 15 international matches. and was a squad player for the Euro 2000.

Coaching career
On 14 January 2013, it was announced that Osmanovski would return to football, working as U21 coach for his previous club Malmö FF.

Career statistics

International

Scores and results list Sweden's goal tally first, score column indicates score after each Osmanovski goal.

Honours 
Malmö FF

 Allsvenskan: 2004

References

External links
 

1977 births
Living people
Macedonian Turks
Footballers from Malmö
Macedonian Muslims
Swedish people of Turkish descent
Swedish Muslims
Association football forwards
Swedish footballers
Macedonian people of Turkish descent
Sweden international footballers
Sweden under-21 international footballers
Swedish expatriate footballers
UEFA Euro 2000 players
FC Rosengård 1917 players
Malmö FF players
S.S.C. Bari players
Torino F.C. players
FC Girondins de Bordeaux players
Serie A players
Serie B players
Ligue 1 players
Allsvenskan players
Expatriate footballers in Italy
Expatriate footballers in France
Malmö FF non-playing staff
Swedish people of Macedonian descent